Bobby Brown Park, formerly known as Bobby Brown State Outdoor Recreation Area and prior to that Bobby Brown State Park, is a  park located near Chennault and Middleton. The park's name is a memorial to Robert T. Brown, a lieutenant in the United States Navy who was killed during World War II aboard the submarine .

The park is located on a plot of land that was once Petersburg, a small town that thrived during the 1790s due to its location where the Broad River and Savannah River met. The park is now located next to both Lake Strom Thurmond and Richard B. Russell Lake, two manmade reservoirs. When water levels are low, however, the old town of Petersburg can once again be glimpsed by visitors. The park's strategic location near so much water provides much fishing and water recreation.

History
Bobby Brown State Park was downgraded to Bobby Brown State Outdoor Recreation Area in 2009. In 2015, a lease agreement was reached with the Georgia Department of Natural Resources. The park is now operated by the government of Elbert County, Georgia.

Facilities
 61 Tent/Trailer/RV Sites
 Pioneer Camping
 Boat Ramp and Dock
 2 Picnic Shelters

References

External links
 

State parks of Georgia (U.S. state)
Protected areas of Elbert County, Georgia